Squads who participated in the 2003 FIFA Confederations Cup

Group A

Colombia
Head coach: Francisco Maturana

France
Head coach: Jacques Santini

Japan
Head coach:  Zico

New Zealand
Head coach:  Mick Waitt

Group B

Brazil
Head coach: Carlos Alberto Parreira

Cameroon
Head coach:  Winfried Schäfer

Marc-Vivien Foé died during the tournament during the semi-final with Colombia.

Turkey
Head coach: Şenol Güneş

United States
Head coach: Bruce Arena

External links
FIFA.com

FIFA Confederations Cup squads
Squad